Off to Philadelphia in the Morning is a 1978 BBC three-part television drama series based on the book of the same name by Jack Jones to a screenplay by Elaine Morgan. It is a fictionalised account of the life of the Welsh composer and academic Joseph Parry.

The series of three 50 minute episodes was made by BBC Cymru Wales and produced and directed by John Hefin. The cast primarily featured Welsh actors while Gareth Ridgewell Whiley (born 1967), who played Joseph Parry as a boy, was living in Merthyr Tydfil in Wales where he was attending school.

Synopsis

Part 1
Life in the fearsome industrial coal and iron town of Merthyr Tydfil is harsh and dangerous and in the iron works Dick Llewellyn is blinded and disfigured in a splash of molten metal. Young Joseph is inspired when he hears a brass band playing at Cyfarthfa Castle. Daniel Parry dreams of escaping the rigours of his life to a new life in the United States, but his wife does not want to go.

Part 2
Having persuaded his wife, Daniel Parry and his family have settled in America, but young Joseph Parrys's ambitious wife Jane urges him to seek musical fame in London where during a performance of Rigoletto he encounters his old boyhood friend Myfanwy Llewellyn, who now calls herself Lina Van Elyn.

Part 3
Joseph Parry collapses near the end of a long and strenuous tour of conducting his works
in the United States. As his wife becomes more difficult and demanding Parry's thoughts increasingly turn to his childhood sweetheart, Myfanwy Llewellyn. In  London he ignores the advice of Sir William Sterndale Bennett and returns to Wales as Professor of Music at Aberystwyth. Parry clashes with the Principal, and the newly-founded University College Wales, Aberystwyth wonders what it has let itself in for.

Cast

Gerald James ... Mr. Thomas (Ieuan Ddu)
William Squire ... Daniel Parry
Rachel Thomas ... Betty Parry
Connie Booth ... Jane Parry 
Donna Edwards ... Myfanwy Llewellyn
Dafydd Hywel ... Henry Parry
Delme Bryn-Jones ... Dick Llewellyn
David Lyn ... Joseph Parry
David Markham ... Sir William Sterndale Bennett
Gaynor Morgan Rees ... Anne Parry
Dewi Morris ... Robbie Jones 
Siân Phillips ... Lina Van Elyn
Gareth Ridgewell Whiley ... young Joseph Parry
Dennis Burgess ... Sir William Crawley
Meredith Edwards ... Principal Thomas Charles Edwards
Michael Forrest ... Sergeant
Geraint Jarman ... Student
Fidelma Murphy ... Cathy Llewellyn
Dillwyn Owen ... Professor Jones

Locations
Among the filming locations were: the Thames Embankment; Cyfarthfa Castle in Merthyr Tydfil; Constitution Hill, Aberystwyth; the Old College, Aberystwyth and the seafront at Aberystwyth.

References

External links

BBC television dramas
1978 British television series debuts
1978 British television series endings
1970s Welsh television series